Brian Lacey may refer to:

 Brian Lacey (entertainment executive), founder of Lacey Entertainment
 Brian Lacey (sport shooter), competitive rifle shooter from New Zealand
 Brian Lacey (Gaelic footballer) (born 1974), Irish retired Gaelic footballer